Fazl-e-Omar Hospital, Rabwah is a private health care institute in an area of Punjab, Pakistan. It is run by the Ahmadiyya Jamaat. Founded in 1958, it provides hospital services to the local community and patients from towns and villages from further afield.

The hospital provides medical care in specialities such as medicine, surgery and paediatrics.

Begum Zubaida Bani Wing 
2003 saw the opening of the new gynaecology/obstetrics unit at the hospital, Begum Zubaida Bani Wing. The 3-storey modern facility was opened to provide a wide range of medical/surgical services for women including gynaecology outpatient's clinic, gynaecology, antenatal/postnatal wards and operation theatre. Also incorporated in the building is the paediatric ICU unit. The department has a 24-hour delivery suite with approximately 900 delivery cases annually. The new building has a modern décor with large waiting areas, including a children's play area in the outpatient's clinic, and well decorated, fully air-conditioned private rooms, central oxygen supply & suction units. Begum Zub-aida Bani Wing also has a separate set-up for hepatitis patients.

To facilitate doctor and nurse training a seminar room and library are also available in the new wing. With the opening of this new centre it is hoped that the hospital can provide the most up-to-date medical care for women in the area including services such as colour Doppler and bone density measurement. It is also equipped with patients elevator.

Tahir Heart Institute 
Tahir Heart Institute
One of the plans for the near future is the opening of a new 6-storey cardiac institute. The centre is to be named after the fourth Khalifa of the Ahmadiyya Jamaat, Mirza Tahir Ahmad, who died in April 2003 and whose desire it was to have such a centre in Rabwah. The new institute will provide a wide range of cardiac care including open heart surgery, angiography / angioplasty treatment and full cardiac support services.
A 250 seated auditorium will also be built, as well as facilities for patient care THI will also incorporate a research centre. The central office for the International Ahmadiyya Medical Association will be in this new wing. In addition to this, architectural plans are being made for the roof of the new centre to be used as a base for an air ambulance used to transport patients to and from the hospital.

Services 
The following medical services are available in the hospital:
 General Surgery
 Gynaecology And Obstetrics
 ENT
 Eye surgery
 Dental Surgery
 Anaesthesia
 Medicine
 Paediatriac
 Laboratory Services
 Radiology Services
 Pharmaceuticals Services

Visiting faculty 
The hospital also enjoys the services of a visiting faculty:
 Cardiology (2 days a month)
 Dermatology (visiting specialist once a month)
 Psychiatry (visiting specialist once a month)
 Cosmetic and Plastic surgery (visiting specialist once a month)

See also 
 Rabwah
 Ahmadiyya Muslim Community

External links 
 The official website of The Heart Institute
 The official site of Ahmadiyya Muslim Community

Hospital buildings completed in 1958
Hospitals in Punjab, Pakistan
Ahmadiyya hospitals
Hospitals established in 1958
1958 establishments in Pakistan